The Prix Berteux was a Group 3 flat horse race in France open to three-year-old thoroughbreds. It was run at various tracks over a distance of 3,000 metres (about 1⅞ miles), and it was scheduled to take place each year in June or July.

History
During the 19th century, the event was staged at Longchamp as the Prix de la Néva. It usually took place on the day before the Grand Prix de Paris. For a period it was contested over 2,900 metres, and it was extended to 3,000 metres in 1889.

The race continued as the Prix de la Néva until 1913. It was renamed in honour of Count de Berteux, a successful racehorse owner, in 1914.

The Prix Berteux was held at Maisons-Laffitte in 1943, and Auteuil in 1944. It was subsequently transferred to Chantilly. The present system of race grading was introduced in 1971, and the event was given Group 3 status.

The venue of the Prix Berteux changed frequently in the 1990s. It had brief spells at Longchamp (1991–92), Maisons-Laffitte (1993–94, 3,100 metres) and Deauville (1995). It was held at Maisons-Laffitte again in 1996, and returned to Chantilly in 1997.

The event was switched to Vichy in 2001, and to Deauville in 2003. It was discontinued in 2004.

Records
Leading jockey since 1979 (4 wins):
 Gérald Mossé – Bayrika (1994), Pozarica (1998), Roman Saddle (2001), Mr Dinos (2002)

Leading trainer since 1979 (7 wins):
 André Fabre – Top Sunrise (1988), Sharnfold (1989), Ecologist (1991), Raintrap (1993), Affidavit (1995), New Frontier (1997), Artistique (1999)

Leading owner since 1979 (3 wins):
 Khalid Abdullah – Sharnfold (1989), Ecologist (1991), Raintrap (1993)

Winners since 1979

Earlier winners
 1869: Trompette
 1870: Don Carlos
 1871: no race
 1872: Condor *
 1873: Torrent
 1874: Figaro
 1875: Galba
 1876: Soumarin
 1877: Ravisseur
 1878: Boulouf
 1879: Courtois
 1880: Orpheon
 1881: Gerald
 1882: Quolibet
 1883: Florestan
 1884: Beauregard
 1885: Lavandiere
 1886: Fils d'Artois
 1887: Cambyse
 1888: Max
 1889: Vasistas
 1890: Liliane
 1891: Courant d'Air
 1892: Arrosage
 1893: Cadet Roussel
 1894: Algarade
 1895: Marseillan
 1896: Panpan
 1897: Inflexible
 1898: Fenouil

 1899: Irkoutsk
 1900: Annecy
 1901: Ali
 1902: Surprenant
 1903: Lavandier
 1904: Georgien
 1905: Avanti
 1906: Caramel
 1907: Roi Herode
 1908: Montavalle
 1909: Chandos
 1910: Sursis
 1911: Pire
 1912: Take Are
 1913: Pendragon
 1914: Djamy
 1919: Juveigneur
 1920: Embry
 1921: Le Prodige
 1922: Almaviva
 1923: Mousko
 1924: Dauphin
 1925: Chubasco
 1926: Sapajou
 1927: Montemafroy
 1928: Cri de Guerre
 1929: Innoxa
 1930: Tiresias
 1931: Prytanee
 1932: Henin

 1933: Assuerus
 1934: Silver Bow
 1935: Votre Altesse
 1936: Carius
 1937: Chinchilla
 1938: Vaisseau Fantome
 1939: Le Souriceau
 1941: Nabah
 1942: Grand Kid
 1943: Marsyas
 1944: Derio
 1951: Pharas
 1953: Fontenoy
 1959: Seddouk
 1961: Granadero
 1962: Celadon
 1963: Azincourt
 1964: White Label
 1965: Pompon Rouge
 1967: Misyaaf
 1969: Chaparral
 1970: Colbert
 1971: Rakosi
 1972: Lassalle
 1973: Recupere
 1974: Le Bavard
 1975: no race
 1976: Campero
 1977: Yelpana
 1978: Act One

* The 1872 race finished as a dead-heat between Condor and Tabac, but it was decided by a run-off.

See also
 List of French flat horse races

References

 France Galop / Racing Post:
 pedigreequery.com – Prix Berteux.

Horse races in France
Flat horse races for three-year-olds
Discontinued horse races